Autism spectrum disorder (ASD) is a neurological disorder affecting one's social interaction, communication, routine, etc. The disorder is observed across the globe. Autism in China is known as 自闭症 (pinyin: zì bì zhèng, literal translation: "self-enclosure disorder") or 孤独症 (pinyin: gū dú zhèng, literal translation: "lonely disorder") in Chinese. It is also common for autistic individuals to be called metaphorically as 来自星星的孩子 (translation: "children from the star").

Autism has a prevalence rate of around 1% among the Chinese population. Autism was first recognized as a neurological disability in 2006. Since 2006, China has passed a number of laws to ensure the state service and inclusion of autistic individuals.

The diagnosis of autism in China adapts several international assessment tools and a procedure carried out by the psychiatrist. However, there are shortfalls related to under-diagnosis and misdiagnosis.

Public schools, special education schools are two possible paths for autistic children to receive education. However, due to the lack of professional training in autism intervention in those institutions and frequent rejections, most parents send their children to private treatment centres, which are costly.

There are several non-governmental organization in China established in aim to provide autism intervention and parent trainings, as well as improving the emotional well-being for both the children and parents.

Finally, there has been increasing social support and media coverage of autism, as well as autism awareness songs and films in the past decade, particularly surrounding World Autism Awareness Day.

Epidemiology 
Studies found the autism prevalence rate in China to be around 0.26% to 1%, which corresponds to about 3.9 million to 14.5 million out of 1.4 billion individuals.

However, many researchers, both domestic and international, suggested an underestimation, as:

1) most of these studies only included the population in special education schools and not in public schools and

2) most of the studies did not use contemporary screening or diagnostic methods.

The underestimation is also related to under-diagnosis and misdiagnosis due to the lack of autism awareness amongst Chinese professionals, and especially psychiatrists.

Therefore, the estimated autism prevalence rate of 1% might be more accurate, and the percentage is increasing every year. Western countries (e.g. the United States (put data) ) and other Asian countries (e.g. South Korea) have reported similar or higher autism prevalence rates and increasing trends.

Laws related to rights of autistic individuals

Assessment and diagnosis

Progress and methods of assessment 
Autism was first diagnosed in China in 1982 by Professor Tao Guotai (陶国泰) from Nanjing Brain Hospital presented the case in a Chinese journal. In the late 1980s, he introduced his findings to the global audience in English.

Since then, Chinese professionals have translated and used several international methods of assessment. Currently, the most common methods of assessment include the Chinese version of the Child Autism Rating Scale (CARS), the Autism Behavior Checklist (ABC), and the Chinese revised version of the Checklist for Autism in Toddlers (CHAT). Other methods of assessment include the Chinese versions of the Psycho-Educational Profile—or C-PEP (PEP), the Autism Diagnostic Observation Schedule (ADOS), and the Autism Diagnostic Interview-Revised (ADI-R).

It is also common for Chinese psychiatrists to diagnose a child as "having autism tendency" (also known as an "autism-like case", or 自闭症倾向) rather than directly as "autistic".

Shortfalls in diagnosis 
Children with early infantile autism are usually the only group who are officially diagnosed. This excludes autistic adults, those with Asperger syndrome, and those on the autism spectrum requiring less support. The lack of trained psychiatrists and diagnosis service outside major cities contributes to this issue.

Education and intervention

Special education schools 
China has had a history of establishing special education schools since the early 1900s. However, the special education schools are mainly tailored toward deaf and blind students rather than those with cognitive and neurological conditions. Children with autism still face frequent rejections from both public and special education schools.

Private institutions 
Because of the limitations of special education schools in China for autistic students, and the difficulty of them integrating into public schools, many families seek autism intervention from private organizations. Because these treatments are not state-run, they cost substantial amount of money. For instance, a 2013 study found that 90% of the families spend ¥7000–¥10,000 (US$1,092.61– $1,560.87) monthly on average to support one autistic child. More specifically, it costs approximately ¥8500 (US$1326.99) in Beijing and ¥ 6790 (US$1,060.03) in Qingdao monthly. Around 30% of parents reported that they cannot sustain this amount of financial burden for a prolonged period.

Voluntary organizations and community support

Beijing Stars and Rain (北京星星雨） 
Beijing Stars and Rain Institution is the first non-governmental organization established for autism in China. It was founded in 1993 by Tian Huiping (田慧萍). The institution runs training programs for both parents and children, and overall has a focus on applied behavior analysis. Beijing Stars and Rain Institution provides professional support for government departments and local intervention centres. The institution collaborates with many organizations such as One Foundation for charity works.

In 2012, Beijing Stars and Rain published the first report on medical support for Chinese autistic children in collaboration with Beijing Normal University. The report highlights the lack of institutional support and the high expense for treatment. The report also exposes that only 16.6% of the practitioners received adequate college training in the field.

Other voluntary organizations, funds or initiatives 
The program 星光溢彩 (Xing Guang Yi Cai) is initiated by the China Social Welfare Foundation's Fund for Autistic Children (中国社会福利基金会自闭症儿童救助基金) in collaboration with Beijing Association for Rehabilitation for Autistic Children (北京市孤独症儿童康复协会). It aims at using art therapy for intervention, emotional care, and teaching life skills to autistic individuals. Currently, the art lessons incorporates fine art, singing, instruments, dance, floristry, gardening, etc.

Community support 
The charity sale (义卖）of artworks by autistic children and charity concerts can be observed on World Autism Awareness Day in most major cities across China and above. This is done in collaboration of rehabilitation centres, businesses and schools. Often, the members of those institutions interact with autistic individuals or simply remain as the audience. Those events are often accompanied by awareness pamphlets or slogans and  receive significant media attention.

Popular Media Coverage

Films 

Children of the Stars (2007) （来自星星的孩子）: documentary about lives of autistic children in China.
Ocean Heaven (2010)（海洋天堂）: about a single father trying to teach his son Dafu life skills and finding a place for him to stay after his precedented death. 
In 2012, Beijing Stars and Rain set up a fundraiser named Ocean Heaven Project (海洋天堂计划) based on the film. It is done in collaboration with One Foundation.

Songs 

 Moms of Stars (2014) (星星的妈妈): song by Huazi.

References 

Autism
Disability in China